Tmesiphantes uru is a species of tarantula in the subfamily Theraphosinae. It is endemic to Argentina.

Taxonomy
The species was first described in 2014 as Melloleitaoina uru. The specific name uru refers to the Incan myth, telling of the princess Inca Uru, who was transformed into a spider by the gods to do endless spinning. In 2019, it was transferred to the genus Tmesiphantes.

Distinguishing features
Tmesiphantes uru has (in the male) an obvious triangular tooth on the embolus, which is very curved. The female has elongated spermathecae with small granules. It can grow 16 mm and has reddish-brown legs, a brown and golden cephalothorax, and a golden-brown urticating patch on the abdomen.

References

Theraphosidae
Spiders of Argentina
Spiders described in 2014